The 2020 African Qualification Tournament for Tokyo Olympic Games was held in Rabat, Morocco from February 22 to February 23, 2020. Each country may enter a maximum of 2 male and 2 female divisions with only one athlete in each division. The winner and runner-up athletes per division qualify for the Olympic Games under their NOC.

Qualification summary

Results

Men

−58 kg
22 February

−68 kg
23 February

−80 kg
23 February

+80 kg
22 February

Women

−49 kg
22 February

−57 kg
23 February

−67 kg
22 February

+67 kg
23 February

References

1st day results
2nd day results

External links
 World Taekwondo Federation

Olympic Qualification
Taekwondo Olympic Qual
Taekwondo qualification for the 2020 Summer Olympics
2020 in Moroccan sport
African Taekwondo Olympic Qualification Tournament